Neodon is a genus of rodent in the family Cricetidae. Species within Neodon are classified as relics of the Pleistocene epoch because the occlusal patterns resemble the extinct Allophaiomys. 
The genus Neodon contains the following species:

 Forrest's mountain vole (Neodon forresti)
 Chinese scrub vole (Neodon irene)
 Linzhi mountain vole (Neodon linzhiensis)
 Sikkim mountain vole (Neodon sikimensis)

References

 A Catalogue of the Mammalia in the Museum of the Hon. East-India Company: 145-146 (as corrected by Kaneko and Smeenk, 1996; not Hodgson, 1849, as entrenched in the literature).

 
Rodent genera
Taxa named by Thomas Horsfield